Maxwell Caulfield (né Maxwell P.J. Newby; born 23 November 1959) is a British-American film, stage, and television actor and singer. He has appeared in Grease 2 (1982), Electric Dreams (1984), The Boys Next Door (1985), The Supernaturals (1986), Sundown: The Vampire in Retreat (1989), Waxwork 2 (1992), Gettysburg (1993), Empire Records (1995), The Real Blonde (1997), The Man Who Knew Too Little (1997), and in A Prince for Christmas (2015). In 2015, Caulfield toured Australia with his wife Juliet Mills and sister-in-law Hayley Mills in the comedy Legends! by Pulitzer Prize winner James Kirkwood. He voiced James Bond in the video game James Bond 007: Nightfire (2002).

Early life
Maxwell P.J. Newby was born on 23 November 1959 in Belper, Derbyshire to Peter Newby and Oriole Rosalind Findlater. By 1965, his parents had parted and his mother legally abandoned the surname Newby in favour of her maiden name. Although he did not work regularly as a child actor, at the age of seven he played "Ted" in the 1967 film Accident and was billed as Maxwell Findlater.

Caulfield's American stepfather reportedly kicked him out of the house at the age of 15. Caulfield became an exotic dancer at London's Windmill Theatre to obtain an Equity card enabling him to work as an actor.

Theatre
After obtaining a green card, he made his New York City debut in Hot Rock Hotel (1978) after moving from the UK to the United States, and the following year made his stage debut in Class Enemy (1979), in which he played the lead role; he won a Theatre World Award for his performance. He made his Los Angeles debut in Hitting Town (1980) and appeared in The Elephant Man (1980) that same year, during which he met his future wife, actress Juliet Mills.

In the early 1980s, Caulfield was an active member of the Mirror Repertory Company, part of The Mirror Theater Ltd, performing in numerous repertory productions including Paradise Lost, Rain, Inheritors and The Hasty Heart. He made his debut Off-Broadway in 1981 as the title character, a homicidal drifter, in Joe Orton's Entertaining Mr. Sloane (alongside Joseph Maher and Barbara Bryne). His performance was widely praised; one critic wrote:
"Maxwell Caulfield is the ideal spider in the web", wrote one critic, saying he [Caulfield] was "as disarming of himself as he is of others – which gives this revival that tragic tinge of great comedy."Review of Entertaining Mr. Sloane, The New York Times, 4 September 1981.

Caulfield made his Broadway debut in J. B. Priestley's An Inspector Calls opposite Siân Phillips. He appeared with Jessica Tandy and Elizabeth Wilson in Salonika at the Public Theater in New York, appearing fully nude for much of the play, and in Joe Orton's black comedy Loot at the Mark Taper Forum in Los Angeles. In 2006, Caulfield drew attention over his bare-chested scene in the Off-Broadway two-hander Tryst, opposite Amelia Campbell. In 2007, he performed in the Charles Busch play Our Leading Lady with Kate Mulgrew.

In 2007, Caulfield made his West End stage debut as Billy Flynn in the long-running London production of Chicago; he then resumed the role of Flynn for the Broadway production in November 2007. In 2011, he appeared in an Off-Broadway production of the comedy Cactus Flower.

Television
Caulfield has appeared on Dynasty (1985–1986), The Colbys (1985–1987), Murder, She Wrote (1988–1991), Beverly Hills, 90210 (1990), The Rockford Files (1996), Spider-Man (1995–1998), Casualty (2003–2004), Emmerdale (2009–2010) and NCIS (2013). He guest-starred on Modern Family (Season 4, Episode 16, "Bad Hair Day") playing Claire's ex-boyfriend and college professor.

Personal life
Caulfield has been married since 1980 to actress Juliet Mills, daughter of actor Sir John Mills and writer Lady Mills (née Mary Hayley Bell), and is a brother-in-law of Jonathan Mills and actress Hayley Mills. Caulfield is stepfather to Melissa (née Miklenda; Mills' daughter from her second marriage) and Sean Caulfield (born Sean Alquist; Mills' son from her first marriage).

He became a naturalized United States citizen on 5 September 1991.

Stage credits

Filmography

Film

Television

Audiobook narrations

Anonymous Rex by Eric Garcia (2000)
The Lion of Cormarre and Other Stories: The Collected Stories of Arthur C. Clarke (1937–1949) (2001)
Mimus by Lilli Thal (2007)
Spud by John van de Ruit (2008)
Sebastian Darke: Prince of Fools by Philip Caveney (2008)
Spud: The Madness Continues by John van de Ruit (2009)
The War of the Worlds by H. G. Wells (2012)

Video games 

 James Bond 007: Nightfire (2002) as James Bond
 Eragon (2006) as Brom

Discography

 1982: "Charades" on the Grease 2 soundtrack (as Michael Carrington)
 1982: "(Love Will) Turn Back the Hands of Time" with Michelle Pfeiffer on the Grease 2 soundtrack
 1982: "Who's That Guy?" with Cast on the Grease 2 soundtrack
 1982: "Reproduction" with Cast on the Grease 2 soundtrack
 1982: "Rock-A-Hula-Luau (Summer Is Coming)" with Cast on the Grease 2 soundtrack
 1982: "We'll Be Together" with Cast on the Grease 2 soundtrack
 1995: "Say No More (Mon Amore)" in Alan Moyle's Empire Records (as Rex Manning)

Awards and nominations

 Theater World Award (1979) for his performance in Class Enemy (Players Theatre, West Village, New York City).

References

External links
 
 
 

1959 births
English people of Scottish descent
Living people
American male film actors
American male musical theatre actors
American male soap opera actors
American male stage actors
American male television actors
American male voice actors
English expatriates in the United States
English male film actors
English male musical theatre actors
English male soap opera actors
English male stage actors
English male voice actors
20th-century English male actors
21st-century English male actors
Naturalized citizens of the United States
People from Belper